Dey Young is an American actress and sculptor.

Biography
Young was born in Bloomfield Hills, Michigan, the daughter of Pauline, a sociologist, and Donald E. Young.  Her sister is Leigh Taylor-Young  and her brother is Lance Young, a writer and producer in the film industry.

Among Young's acting credits is the part of Kate Rambeau in Rock 'n' Roll High School, a character she re-visited in the 1994 film Shake, Rattle and Rock!. She has also appeared in films such as Strange Behavior, The Running Man, The Serpent and the Rainbow, Spontaneous Combustion, Pretty Woman, No Place to Hide, Conflict of Interest, National Lampoon's Barely Legal and Flicka. 

She has also performed in several guest roles in the  Star Trek franchise, as Hannah Bates on the Star Trek: The Next Generation episode "The Masterpiece Society", Arissa on the Star Trek: Deep Space Nine episode "A Simple Investigation", and Keyla on the Star Trek: Enterprise episode "Two Days and Two Nights".  Her science fiction credits also extend to playing a waitress in the 1987 Mel Brooks comedy Spaceballs. In 1995 she appeared in the TV series Extreme based on a Rocky Mountain Search and Rescue team. She appeared in a two part episode of Diagnosis Murder "Fatal Impact" in 1997.  On May 23, 2008, Young appeared on The Young and the Restless as Elizabeth Hartford, the ex-wife of character David Chow.

Young is also a professional sculptor, working in stone, clay, and bronze.

Selected filmography

References

External links
 
 
 

1955 births
Living people
American film actresses
American television actresses
Actresses from Michigan
People from Bloomfield Hills, Michigan
20th-century American actresses
21st-century American actresses
20th-century American sculptors
20th-century American women artists